In Greek mythology, Eurydice (Ancient Greek: Εὐρυδίκη Eurydikē  "wide justice", derived from ευρυς eurys "wide" and δικη dike "justice) was a queen of Troy as the wife of Ilus, founder of Ilium. She was the daughter of Adrastus and the mother of King Laomedon of Troy and possibly, of Themiste, Telecleia and Tithonus. In some accounts, Batia, daughter of Teucer was said to be the consort of Ilus but if the family tree recorded by Apollodorus is correct, Batia could hardly have been the wife of Ilus, since she was his great-grandmother. According to Hyginus, the wife of Ilus was called Leucippe, otherwise unknown.

Notes

References 
 Gaius Julius Hyginus, Fabulae from The Myths of Hyginus translated and edited by Mary Grant. University of Kansas Publications in Humanistic Studies. Online version at the Topos Text Project.
 Pseudo-Apollodorus, The Library with an English Translation by Sir James George Frazer, F.B.A., F.R.S. in 2 Volumes, Cambridge, MA, Harvard University Press; London, William Heinemann Ltd. 1921. Online version at the Perseus Digital Library. Greek text available from the same website.

Queens in Greek mythology